Nawab Sir Nizamat Jung Bahadur (April 1871 in Hyderabad State – 1955) was an Arab-Indian poet. Nizamuddin was the second son of the Late Nawab Rafath Yar Jung Bahadur (Moulvi Shaikh Ahmed Hussain), Subedar of Warangal, well known in his days as an ardent educational and social reformer and statesman of no mean order.

Life
Nawab Sir Nizamath Jung, was educated at the Madrassa-i-Aizza, a school founded by his father in 1878, and proceeding to England in 1887 joined Trinity College, Cambridge, and took the degrees of B. A., LL. B. Honours ) in 1891 being the first Hyderabadi to achieve this.

Later on he became a Barrister-at-Law, being called to the Bar from the Inner Temple in 1895 during his second visit to England.

Nizamuddin built Hill Fort Palace on Naubat Pahad, which was later purchased by the erstwhile Nizam HEH Mir Osman Ali Khan for his son Prince Moazzam Jah. Nizamuddin's first cousin Hakim-ud-Dowla was also a chief justice and he was the owner of the Bella Vista Palace located adjacent to Hill Fort Palace.

Serving as an official of numerous prestigious posts, he was a political minister and served as the chief justice of the Hyderabad Deccan High Court during the reign of the Nizams.

Legacy 
His personal book collection was made available for the public in 1972 when the Nizamat Jung Memorial Library was established in his name at Narayanguda, Hyderabad.

References

External links
 
 

1871 births
1955 deaths
Indian male poets
Indian Muslims
People from Hyderabad State
Salar Jung family
Alumni of Trinity College, Cambridge
20th-century Indian poets
Indian Knights Bachelor
20th-century Indian male writers
Poets from Telangana